Fábio Emanuel Moreira Silva (born 5 April 1985) is a Cape Verdean international footballer who plays professionally for LASK Linz, as a midfielder.

Career
Silva has played club football in Portugal, Spain, Slovenia and the Ukraine for Estrela da Amadora, Benfica B, Tenerife B, Drava Ptuj, Odivelas, Espinho and Metalurh Zaporizhya.

Silva made his international debut for Cape Verde in 2011.

References

1985 births
Living people
Footballers from Lisbon
Cape Verdean footballers
Cape Verde international footballers
Portuguese footballers
Portuguese people of Cape Verdean descent
Association football midfielders
CD Tenerife B players
C.F. Estrela da Amadora players
NK Drava Ptuj players
Odivelas F.C. players
S.C. Espinho players
FC Metalurh Zaporizhzhia players
Kazincbarcikai SC footballers
LASK players
Ukrainian Premier League players
Cape Verdean expatriate footballers
Cape Verdean expatriate sportspeople in Portugal
Expatriate footballers in Portugal
Cape Verdean expatriate sportspeople in Spain
Expatriate footballers in Spain
Expatriate footballers in Slovenia
Expatriate footballers in Ukraine
Cape Verdean expatriate sportspeople in Ukraine
Cape Verdean expatriate sportspeople in Hungary
Expatriate footballers in Hungary
Expatriate footballers in Austria